Chandamama in Kannada and Telugu means moon. It may refer to:

 Chandamama, an Indian monthly magazine focused on kids and youngsters
 Chandamama (1999 film), a Malayalam film starring Kunchacko Boban
 Chandamama (2007 film), a Telugu film directed by Krishna Vamsi
 Chandamama (2013 film), a Tamil film starring Karunas